Michael George Baker  is an epidemiologist with the University of Otago. Baker is a member of the New Zealand Food Safety Authority's Academy and of the New Zealand Ministry of Health's Pandemic Influenza Technical Advisory Group (PITAG).

Early life 
Baker has an identical twin brother, David, who is a general practitioner in Sydney, Australia. The twins are the eldest of four children. They attended secondary school in Hamilton and medical school in Auckland. Michael Baker studied at the University of Otago, where he graduated MB ChB and earned a Diploma in Public Health, and the University of Auckland where he obtained a Diploma in Obstetrics.

Career 
He originally wanted to specialise in emergency medicine or psychiatry, but got a job in Wellington as a medical advisor for the Minister of Health. In that role he worked on the response to the HIV/AIDS epidemic, and helped to set up a needle exchange programme.

He was appointed to the faculty at the University of Otago in 1997, rising to the rank of professor in the Department of Public Health at the University of Otago, Wellington in 2013.

He has campaigned to reduce campylobacter contamination in chicken in New Zealand.

COVID-19 pandemic 
In January 2020, Baker began to read reports about the COVID-19 outbreak in China, and he was asked to join the Ministry of Health's COVID-19 Technical Advisory Group. In February 2020 he was advocating with colleagues at the University of Otago to 'stamp out' COVID-19 in New Zealand and keep it out, rather than trying to 'flatten the curve'. The Government eventually introduced a countrywide lockdown.

In April 2020, Baker stated that New Zealand had the "most decisive and strongest lockdown in the world at the moment" and that it is the only Western country where the goal is to eliminate COVID-19. Baker thinks we will look back on COVID-19 as "the most profound public health intervention in our history".

In October 2021, Baker advocated a regional approach to countering the Delta variant outbreak in Auckland that began in August 2021. He argued that a regional approach would allow Auckland to pursue a suppression approach while the rest of the country could continue with an elimination strategy. 

In November 2021, Baker and several fellow University of Otago academics including Dr Lucy Telfar Barnard, Dr Jennifer Summers, and Lesley Gray criticised the Managed Isolation and Quarantine (MIQ) system's requirement that vaccinated travellers be tested as "inconsistent and arbitrary," asserting that they posed a lower risk of contracting COVID-19 than Aucklanders during the Delta variant.

In December 2021, Baker expressed concerns that the Government's new COVID-19 Protection Framework ("traffic light system") in and abandonment of internal borders could lead to a rise in cases but added that the infection could be blunted by vaccination efforts and the warmer summer weather. He credited vaccination, contact tracing and the previous Alert Level 3 lockdown with helping to combat the spread of the virus in 2021. In mid-December, Baker advocated that the Government delay its planned reopening of New Zealand's borders in January 2022 to counter the spread of the SARS-CoV-2 Omicron variant. He also stated that New Zealand was one of the few countries alongside Taiwan, China and some Australian states to have a "robust border quarantine system."

In early January 2022, Baker questioned the effectiveness of the "traffic light system" in dealing with Omicron community outbreaks and has advocated localised lockdowns. He has also expressed support for the Government's moves to lower the waiting period between second vaccines doses and booster shots from six to four months and encouraged the vaccination of children.

In February 2022, Baker expressed concerns that the Ministry of Health's daily COVID-19 reports underestimated infections within the community since many of the infected took several days to develop symptoms of COVID-19.  He also credited the country's "traffic light settings" and contact tracing efforts with slowing the spread of COVID-19 in comparison to overseas.

In early September 2022, Baker advocated scrapping the "traffic light system" in favour of moving the country towards a "more straightforward system." Baker's remarks accompanies reports that the Government was considering abandoning the "traffic light system" when it reviewed New Zealand's COVID-19 settings later in the month.

In mid-October 2022, Baker advocated the reinstatement of a form of the alert level system after the country reported its first case of the Omicron subvariant BQ.1.1 on 13 October.

In early November 2022, Baker advocated reinstating mask requirements for public transportation and flights to combat rising COVID-19 hospitalisation and death rates caused by the third wave of COVID-19 sweeping through New Zealand in 2022.

Honours and awards 
In 2013, Baker was awarded the HRC Liley Medal for his contribution to the health and medical sciences. He was a joint recipient of the Shorland Medal in 2019 for his work with the SHIVERS team of influenza researchers.

In the 2021 New Year Honours, Baker was appointed a Member of the New Zealand Order of Merit, for services to public health science.

Baker received the 2020 Prime Minister's Science Communication Prize, recognising his 2000+ interviews on COVID-19 since January 2020. He was awarded the 2021 Cranwell Medal for science communication by the New Zealand Association of Scientists. In 2022, he was awarded the Callaghan Medal by the Royal Society Te Apārangi for "science-informed commentary on the Covid-19 pandemic and other major public health issues in Aotearoa New Zealand".

Personal life 
Baker lives in Brooklyn, Wellington, with his family.

Selected publications
 
 
 
 
 
Baker, Michael G.; Wilson, Nick; Blakely, Tony (2020). "Elimination could be the optimal response strategy for covid-19 and other emerging pandemic diseases"  BMJ.  371:m4907 doi: https://doi.org/10.1136/bmj.m4907

References

External links
Sciencemediacentre.co.nz
Profile at University of Otago

Academic staff of the University of Otago
New Zealand epidemiologists
New Zealand public health doctors
New Zealand medical researchers
Members of the New Zealand Order of Merit
University of Otago alumni
University of Auckland alumni

Living people
Year of birth missing (living people)